Adelophryne maranguapensis is a species of frog in the family Eleutherodactylidae. It is endemic to Serra de Maranguape, just west of Fortaleza, in Ceará state, northeastern Brazil.

Description
Based on the type series including two adult males and a single adult female, adult males measure  and adult females  in snout–vent length. The head is longer than it is wide. The snout is truncate in dorsal view and pointed in profile, slightly projecting
beyond the mouth. The tympanum is distinct in most specimens. There is no supra-tympanic fold and the canthus rostralis is indistinct. The fingers have no webbing and have small discs; only the third finger has discs that is distinctly wider than the adjacent phalange. The toes have no webbing either but the discs are more distinct than those on the fingers. Skin is smooth. The dorsal coloration is dark to reddish brown with an hourglass like central pattern. There is a dark brown lateral band. The limbs are crossbanded. The lower parts are light brown to beige.

Reproduction
The male advertisement call consists of 5–8 multi-pulse notes with a dominant frequency around 4800 Hz; the calling males were observed in March, during the rainy season in Serra de Maranguape.

The female measuring 17 mm had four large eggs. The clutches were wound above the water accumulated in the axils. Clutch size varied between three and eight; it is possible that the clutches may represent more than one female; the different developmental stages seen in one clutch at least shows that the eggs were not deposited at the same time.

Habitat and conservation
It is known from both primary and secondary forest and even bamboo and banana plantations, but not open habitats. It is a diurnal leaf-litter species but can also be found in bromeliads above the ground. It is threatened by habitat loss caused by logging, agriculture, and human settlement, and by collection of bromeliads for sale.

References

maranguapensis
Endemic fauna of Brazil
Amphibians of Brazil
Amphibians described in 1994
Taxonomy articles created by Polbot
Taxa named by Marinus Steven Hoogmoed